The Stella Maris Church is a Catholic church which is located in Alta Vista Drive on the island of Cayman Brac about 143 kilometers from the main island of the Cayman Islands, a British overseas territory in the Caribbean Sea.

The church follows the Roman or Latin rite and is part of the jurisdiction of the mission sui iuris of the Cayman Islands (Missio sui iuris insularum Cayanensium).

Its building was built at cost of approximately $800,000 U.S. and is the first Catholic church on the island.  The building was blessed and opened for religious services on 5 February 2011 with the presence of Archbishop Allen Vigneron, the Archbishop of Detroit in the United States who is the Superior of the Mission "Sui Iuris" of Cayman Islands.  The church is within the Detroit archdiocese.

The St. Ignatius Church, George Town is the parent church to this one, and is the only other Roman Catholic church in the Cayman Islands.

See also
Roman Catholicism in the United Kingdom
Stella Maris (disambiguation)

References

External links
Stella Maris Catholic Church -  Cayman Brac, with photos

Roman Catholic churches in the Cayman Islands
Buildings and structures in Cayman Brac
Roman Catholic churches completed in 2011